Michael Charles Barber, SJ (born July 13, 1954) is an American prelate of the Roman Catholic Church who has been serving as bishop of the Diocese of Oakland in California since 2013.

Biography

Early life and education
Michael Barber was born on July 13, 1954, in Salt Lake City, Utah. After attending Saint Pius X Preparatory School in Galt, California, Barber entered the Jesuit novitiate in 1973. He then attended Loyola Marymount University.  Barber received a bachelor's degree in philosophy and history at Gonzaga University in Spokane, Washington in 1978. From 1982 to 1985, Barber studied sacred theology at Regis College at the University of Toronto in Toronto, Ontario. In 1989, he obtained a Licentiate in Systematic Theology at the Pontifical Gregorian University in Rome.

Ordination and ministry
Barber was ordained a priest by Archbishop John Quinn for the Society of Jesus on June 8, 1985. He made his final vows in 2005. After his ordination, Barber he held the following positions:

 Missionary in Apia, Western Samoa (1985-1987)
 Assistant professor at the Gregorian University (1990-1991) 
 Tutor and chaplain at the University of Oxford in England and bursar of the Jesuit community at Campion Hall at Oxford (1992-1998)
 Director of the School of Pastoral Leadership for the archdiocese with residence at Saint Agnes Parish, and then, at the Saint Ignatius College in San Francisco (1998-2001)
 Professor and spiritual director at St. Patrick's Seminary in Menlo Park, California (2002-2010)

In 1991, Barber became a chaplain in the U.S. Naval Reserve, achieving the rank of captain. He received the Meritorious Service Medal from the Navy and was invested as a knight of the holy sepulchre and a magistral chaplain of the Order of Malta. In 2010, Barber became the director of spiritual formation at Saint John's Seminary in the Archdiocese of Boston.

Bishop of Oakland
On May 3, 2013, Pope Francis appointed Barber as bishop of the Diocese of Oakland. He was consecrated by Archbishop Salvatore J. Cordileone on May 25, 2013. Barber was the first American bishop appointed by Pope Francis. Besides English, Barber speaks Italian, French, Samoan, liturgical Spanish and Latin.

In March, 2014, Barber transferred two pastors, one of whom was openly gay, from Newman Hall Holy Spirit Parish in Berkeley, California. Barber refused to provide any explanation to the pastors or to unhappy parishioners for the transfers. In 2019, Barber positioned himself against the proposed California State Senate Bill 360, which would require priests to break the seal of confession and report sexual abuse of minors. He was quoted "I will go to jail before I will obey this attack on our religious freedom."

See also

 Catholic Church hierarchy
 Catholic Church in the United States
 Historical list of the Catholic bishops of the United States
 List of Catholic bishops of the United States
 Lists of patriarchs, archbishops, and bishops

References

External links
 Roman Catholic Diocese of Oakland official website
 Bishop Barber, Diocese of Oakland
 Pope Names Jesuit as Bishop of Oakland
 Pope names Jesuit to lead Oakland diocese
 "Space" Oddity – Cali Jesuit in Boston Launched to Oakland
 NOMINA DEL VESCOVO DI OAKLAND (U.S.A.)

Episcopal succession
 

1954 births
Living people
20th-century American Jesuits
21st-century American Jesuits
21st-century Roman Catholic bishops in the United States
American expatriates in Canada
American expatriates in Italy
Bishops appointed by Pope Francis
Catholics from California
Clergy from Salt Lake City
Jesuit bishops
Knights of the Holy Sepulchre
People from Galt, California
People from Oakland, California
Pontifical Gregorian University alumni